The Greensboro Open was a golf tournament on the Buy.com Tour from 1998 to 2000. It was played at the Sedgefield Country Club in Greensboro, North Carolina.

The purse in 2000 was US$400,000, with $72,000 going to the winner.

Winners

Former Korn Ferry Tour events
Golf in North Carolina
Sports in the Piedmont Triad
Recurring sporting events established in 1998
Recurring sporting events disestablished in 2000